Ulf Findeisen (born 2 March 1962) is an East German former ski jumper.

Career
He won a silver medal in the team large hill at the 1984 FIS Nordic World Ski Championships in Engelberg. Findeisen won two World Cup competitions in his career (1986, 1987).

World Cup

Standings

Wins

External links

1962 births
Living people
German male ski jumpers
FIS Nordic World Ski Championships medalists in ski jumping
People from Zschopau
Sportspeople from Saxony